Edith Kenao Kanakaʻole (born Edith Ke'kuhikuhiipu'uoneonaali'iokohala Kenao, October 30, 1913October 3, 1979) was a Hawaiian dancer, chanter, teacher, and kumu hula. Born in Honomu, Hawaii in 1913, she was taught hula from a young age, and dropped out of her formal schooling before completing middle school. She began to compose traditional Hawaiian music in 1946, choreographing hula to accompany many of her chants, and founded Halau o Kekuhi in 1953. In the 1970s, she taught Hawaiian studies and the Hawaiian language at Hawaiʻi Community College and later the University of Hawaiʻi at Hilo, where she worked until her death in 1979.

Early life 
Edith Kenao Kanakaʻole was born Edith Ke'kuhikuhiipu'uoneonaali'iokohala Kenao on October 30, 1913, in Honomu, on the Hāmākua coast of Hawaii. Her mother, Mary Keliikuewa Ahiena, was her first hula teacher; she later studied with famous dancer Akoni Mika. Kanakaʻole did not finish middle school, later joking that her formal education ended at "seventh grade and a half".

On January 21, 1933, Edith Kenao married Luka Kanakaʻole; the couple would have six children including Nalani Kanaka‘ole and Pualani Kanaka‘ole Kanahele.

Kanakaʻole was among the first Hawaiian homesteaders to move to Keaukaha, which was established in 1924.

Career 
Kanakaʻole was a Hawaiian dancer, chanter, teacher, and kumu hula. She began composing oli (Hawaiian chants) in 1946, and songs in 1947. She choreographed hula to go with many of her chants. In 1953, after her mother had a stroke, she founded a hālau called Halau o Kekuhi. She trained her daughters Nalani and Pualani to eventually take over the hālau.

Kanakaʻole originated a distinct style of hula derived from the traditions of the Hilo area, in which dancers perform with deeply bent knees and make dynamic movements. She taught this style to her children and her other students at Halau o Kekuhi.

In the 1950s, Kanakaʻole toured the contiguous United States, western Canada, and much of Asia with a hula group named after her daughter Nalani.

Kanakaole helped develop the first Hawaiian language program for public school students at the Keaukaha School in Hilo, as well as the school's Hawaiian Studies kupuna (elder) mentorship program. She additionally composed the chant E Hõ Mai (fully , "Grant Me The Understanding").

Kanakaʻole worked as a teacher at Hawaiʻi Community College from 1971 to 1979, and at the University of Hawaiʻi at Hilo from 1973 to 1979, where she became the lead Hawaiian language teacher at the Ka Haka ʻUla O Keʻelikōlani College of Hawaiian Language and supported student efforts to establish a Bachelor of Arts degree in Hawaiian Studies. At both schools, she created courses and seminars on subjects including ethnobotany, Polynesian history, genealogy, and Hawaiian chant and mythology.

Recognition 
Kanakaʻole represented Hawaii at the Second South Pacific Festival of the Arts in Rotorua, New Zealand in 1976, and the State Association of Hawaiian Civic Clubs named her "Hawaiian of the Year" in 1977. In 1979, she received the Award of Distinction for Cultural Leadership from the Governor of Hawaii, the Order of Ke Ali'i Pauahi Award from Kamehameha Schools, and was named a Living Treasure of Hawai'i. In 1978 and 1979, she won Na Hoku Hanohano Awards for best traditional album; her acceptance speech for the first award was entirely in the Hawaiian language, while the second award was given posthumously.

After Kanakaʻole's death in 1979, the Honolulu Star-Bulletin described her as "[one] of the Big Island's most cherished educators". The Edith Kanakaʻole Multi-Purpose Stadium in Hilo was named in her honor, as was a building at the University of Hawaiʻi at Hilo. In 1990, the Edith Kanaka’ole Foundation was established to perpetuate teachings by Kanakaʻole and her husband.

Kanakaʻole will be one of five women depicted on an American Women quarter in 2023. In a press release announcing the honor, the United States Mint stated that Kanakaʻole's "moʻolelo, or stories, served to rescue aspects of Hawaiian history, customs and traditions that were disappearing due to the cultural bigotry of the time".

Discography 

  ("Pele Prevails in Hawaii") – 1978 Na Hoku Hanohano Award for best traditional album
  ("Cherish the Beloved Land")  – 1979 Na Hoku Hanohano Award for best traditional album

References

Works cited 

1913 births
1979 deaths
University of Hawaiʻi faculty
Musicians from Hawaii
Hula dancers
Educators from Hawaii
Na Hoku Hanohano Award winners